Erling Wälivaara (born 1941) is a Swedish Christian democratic politician, member of the Riksdag 1998–2006.

References

Members of the Riksdag from the Christian Democrats (Sweden)
Living people
1941 births
Members of the Riksdag 2002–2006
Members of the Riksdag 1998–2002
20th-century Swedish politicians
21st-century Swedish politicians